Arkady Iosifovich Khait (25 December 1938 – 22 February 2000) was a Russian Jewish satire, comedy, song and script writer, and a comedian in his late years.

Works
Co-authoring scripts for Nu, pogodi! animated cartoon series
Co-authoring scripts for Leopold the Cat animated cartoon series

Awards
1991: Nika Award, for film Passport (Паспорт)
1990: RSFSR State Prize
1998: People's Artist of the Russian Federation
1985: USSR State Prize for works of literature and arts for children

References

1938 births
2000 deaths
Writers from Moscow
Russian Jews
Soviet Jews
Soviet writers
Russian satirists
Russian lyricists
Male screenwriters
20th-century Russian male writers
Recipients of the USSR State Prize
20th-century Russian screenwriters